Duvidha is a 1973 ghost movie directed by Mani Kaul, based on a Rajasthani story of the same name by Vijaydan Detha. The film stars Ravi Menon and Raisa Padamsee in lead roles. The film was critically acclaimed and won the director the National Film Award for Best Direction and Critics Award for Best film at the 1974 Filmfare Awards. This film was remade in 2005 as Paheli, starring Shahrukh Khan and Rani Mukherjee in the lead roles.

Plot
The film is set in rural Rajasthan. It is based on a story by Vijayadan Detha, which relates a popular folktale from Rajasthan about a merchant's son, Krishanlal (Ravi Menon).

Cast
 Raisa Padamsee as Lachhi
 Ravi Menon as Krishnalal, Merchant's Son
 Hardan
 Shambhudan 
 Manohar Lalas
 Kana Ram
 Bhola Ram

Production
The film was extensively shot in Borunda village, in Tehsil Bilara, Jodhpur district, the village of the author Vijay Dan Detha' Bijji.

Music
The music of film was given by folk musicians of Rajasthan, Ramzan Hammu, Latif and Saki Khan.

Remake
The Amol Palekar movie, Paheli, released in 2005, is also based on the same story.

References

External links
 
 

1973 films
1970s Hindi-language films
1973 drama films
Indian ghost films
Films directed by Mani Kaul
Films based on Indian folklore
Films based on short fiction
Films whose director won the Best Director National Film Award
Films set in Rajasthan
Films shot in Rajasthan
Indian fantasy drama films
Indian folklore
1970s fantasy drama films